Duke of Faial was a Portuguese title of nobility, named for Faial Island in the Azores, which was granted by royal decree of Queen Maria II of Portugal, dated from 4 April 1833, to Pedro de Sousa Holstein, a 19th century politician who served as Portugal's first prime-minister. Two months later, on 16 June, Sousa Holstein successfully petitioned the Queen to change the title from Duke of Faial to Duke of Palmela, which he used for the rest of his life.

On 1 December 1834, less than a year from the abolition of the Faial ducal title for Palmela, Queen Maria II created the title of Marquis of Faial, to be used as a substantive title to the heirs of the Dukes of Palmela. Since 1834, the heir of the Duke of Palmela is always referred to as the Marquis of Faial.

Background

When the Queen granted to Dom Pedro de Sousa Holstein the title of Duke of Faial, he was already 1st Count of Palmela (royal decree of 1812) and 1st Marquis of Palmela (royal decree of 1823). Due to his services to the Crown and Country, he obtained the ranking of Duke, as Duke of Faial.

Later a royal decree of the Queen, dated from October 18, 1850, changed his original title to Duke of Palmela.

Chalet Faial
Chalet Faial is an estate in Cascais, on the Portuguese Riviera, located nearby to Palmela Palace (summer estate of the Duke of Palmela). A notable example of Summer architecture, Chalet Faial was built nearby to Palmela Palace to serve as the summer estate of the Marquis of Faial, the heir to the Duke of Palmela.

Duke of Faial
Pedro de Sousa Holstein (1781–1850), Duke of Faial (title changed to Duke of Palmela in 1850).

Marquis of Faial
D. Domingos António Maria Pedro de Sousa e Holstein, 1st Marquis of Faial (later 2nd Duke of Palmela)
D. Maria Luísa de Sousa Holstein, 2nd Marquis of Faial (later 3rd Duke of Palmela)
D. Helena Maria Domingas de Sousa Holstein, 3rd Marquis of Faial (later 5th Duke of Palmela)
D. António Maria da Assunção José Francisco de Paula Vicente João Gabriel Deodato de Sousa e Holstein Beck, 4th Marquis of Faial
D. Luís Maria da Assunção de Sousa e Holstein Beck, 5th Marquis of Faial (later 6th Duke of Palmela)
D. Pedro Domingos de Sousa e Holstein Beck, 6th Marquis of Faial (later 7th Duke of Palmela)

See also
Duke of Palmela
List of Portuguese Dukedoms

External links
 Genealogy of the Duke of Faial

Bibliography
”Nobreza de Portugal e do Brasil" – Vol. II, page 572. Published by Zairol Lda., Lisbon 1989.

 
Faial
1833 establishments in Portugal